The following is a list of breweries in Virginia.

Breweries

This list is separated into the various counties and independent cities in Virginia. In cases where an independent city also serves as the county seat of an adjacent county, that city has been included in the county's list.

Albemarle County

Champion Brewing Company, Charlottesville
James River Brewing Company, Scottsville
Pro Re Nata, Charlottesville, Crozet
Random Row Brewing Co., Charlottesville
South Street Brewery, Charlottesville
Starr Hill Brewery, Crozet
Three Notch'd Brewing Company, Charlottesville

Amherst County
Loose Shoe Brewing Company, Amherst

Alexandria
Aslin
Port City Brewing Company

Arlington
Heritage Brewing
New District Brewing Company

Augusta County
Redbeard Brewing Company, Staunton
Shenandoah Valley Brewing Company, Staunton

Bedford County
Apocalypse Ale Works, Forest
Sunken City Brewery, Hardy
Beale's Brewery, Bedford

Caroline County
Rusty Beaver Brewery, Ruther Glen [CLOSED]

Chesterfield County
Extra Billy's, Midlothian
Steam Bell Brew Works, Midlothian

Culpeper County
Beer Hound Brewery, Culpeper
Far Gohn Brewing Company, Culpeper

Danville
2 Witches Winery & Brewing Company

Fairfax County
Aslin Beer Company, Herndon
Caboose Brewing, Vienna
G34.3 Brewing Company, Lorton
Fairwinds Brewing Company, Lorton

Falls Church
Mad Fox Brewing Company [CLOSED]
Sweetwater Tavern

Fauquier County
Old Bust Head Brewing Company, Warrenton

Franklin County
Chaos Mountain Brewing Company, Callaway
Hammer & Forge Brewing Company, Boones Mill

Frederick County
Backroom Brewery, Middletown

Fredericksburg
Adventure Brewing Company, Eagle Village
Battlefield Brewing Company

Water's End Brewery at Fredericksburg Square

Galax
Creek Bottom Brews

Goochland County
Lickinghole Creek Farm Brewery, Goochland

Hampton
St. George Brewing Company

Hanover County
Center of the Universe Brewing Company, Ashland

Henrico County 
 Final Gravity Brewing Company
 Rock Bottom Brewery
 The Answer Brewpub

Loudoun County
Adroit Theory Brewing Company, Purcellville
Barnhouse Brewery, Leesburg
Belly Love Brewing, Purcellville
Beltway Brewing Company, Sterling
Bike TrAle Brewing, Leesburg
Black Hoof Brewing, Leesburg
Black Walnut Brewery, Leesburg
Crooked Run Brewing, Leesburg
Dog Money Restaurant and Brewery, Leesburg
Dirt Farm Brewing, Bluemont
Dragon Hops Brewing Company, "Purcellville"
Holy Brew Brewing Company, Leesburg
Jack's Run Brewing, Purcellville [CLOSED]
Lost Rhino Brewing Company, Ashburn
Lost Rhino Retreat, Brambleton
Loudoun Brewing, Leesburg
MacDowell Brew Kitchen, Leesburg
Ocelot Brewery, Sterling
Old 690, Purcellville
Old Ox Brewery, Ashburn
Quattro Goomba's Brewery, Aldie
Rocket Frog Brewery, Sterling
Solace Brewing Company, Sterling
Twinpanzee Brewing Company, Sterling

Madison County
Bald Top Brewing Company, Madison

Manassas
BadWolf Brewing Company
Heritage Brewing Company

Montgomery County
Bull & Bones Brewhaus, Blacksburg
Right Mind Brewery, Blacksburg
Rising Silo Brewery, Blacksburg

Nelson County

Blue Mountain Brewery, Afton
Blue Mountain Barrel House
Devils Backbone Brewing Company, Roseland
Wild Wolf Brewing Company, Nellysford

Norfolk
Bold Mariner Brewing Company
O'Connor Brewing Company
Smartmouth Brewing Company

Pulaski County
River Brewing Company, Fairlawn

Richmond
Ardent Craft Ales
Garden Grove Brewing Company
Hardywood Park Craft Brewery
Isley Brewing Company
Legend Brewing Company
Strangeways Brewing
Triple Crossing Brewing Company
The Veil Brewing Co.

Roanoke
Big Lick Brewing Company
Soaring Ridge Craft Brewers (closed November 2019)

Roanoke County
Parkway Brewing, Salem
Twin Creeks Brewing, Vinton

Rockbridge County
Blue Lab Brewing Company, Lexington
Devils Backbone Brewing Company - The Outpost, Lexington

Rockingham County
Brothers Brewing, Harrisonburg

Virginia Beach
Back Bay Brewing Company
Reaver Beach Brewing Company
Home Republic Brewing Company
Pleasure House Brewing Company
Wasserhund Brewing Company
Young Veterans Brewing Company

Washington County
Old Glade Brewery, Glade Spring
The Damascus Brewery, Damascus
Wolf Hills Brewing Company, Abingdon

Waynesboro
Seven Arrows Brewing Company

Williamsburg
Alewerks
Brass Cannon Brewing Company
The Virginia Beer Company

See also 
 Beer in the United States
 List of breweries in the United States
 List of microbreweries

References 

Virginia
Breweries